Murray S. Kucherawy is a computer scientist, mostly known for his work on email standardization and open source software.

He originated in Canada where he studied Mathematics, specializing in Computer Science, Combinatorics and Optimization at the University of Waterloo, earning a Bachelor's degree in 1994.

He worked for several Internet companies, including Sendmail, Cloudmark, and Facebook, which is his current employer (as of 2022).  At the same time, he leaded several IETF working groups, including MARF, WEIRDS, and DMARC. He also wrote several RFCs (see below) and papers.  In concert with such activity, he created various open source software packages, including OpenDKIM and OpenDMARC,  in the framework of The Trusted Domain Project.

IETF contributions
 , Apr 2009, Message Header Field for Indicating Message Authentication Status 
 , Aug 2010, An Extensible Format for Email Feedback Reports 
 , Sep 2010, Authentication-Results Registration for Differentiating among Cryptographic Results 
 , Apr 2011, Authentication-Results Registration for Vouch by Reference Results 
 , Sep 2011, DomainKeys Identified Mail (DKIM) Signatures 
 , Sep 2011, DomainKeys Identified Mail (DKIM) and Mailing Lists 
 , Jan 2012, The Multipart/Report Media Type for the Reporting of Mail System Administrative Messages 
 , Feb 2012, DomainKeys Identified Mail (DKIM) Authorized Third-Party Signatures 
 , Mar 2012, Authentication-Results Registration Update for Sender Policy Framework (SPF) Results 
 , Apr 2012, Redaction of Potentially Sensitive Data from Mail Abuse Reports 
 , Jun 2012, Email Greylisting: An Applicability Statement for SMTP 
 , Jun 2012, Creation and Use of Email Feedback Reports: An Applicability Statement for the Abuse Reporting Format (ARF) 
 , Jun 2012, Extensions to DomainKeys Identified Mail (DKIM) for Failure Reporting 
 , Jul 2012, Resolution of the Sender Policy Framework (SPF) and Sender ID Experiments 
 , Jul 2012, Source Ports in Abuse Reporting Format (ARF) Reports 	
 , Sep 2012, Indicating Email Handling States in Trace Fields 	
 , Sep 2013, Message Header Field for Indicating Message Authentication Status 
 , Nov 2013, An Architecture for Reputation Reporting 
 , Nov 2013, A Media Type for Reputation Interchange 
 , Nov 2013, A Reputation Query Protocol 
 , Nov 2013, A Reputation Response Set for Email Identifiers 
 , Jan 2014, Advice for Safe Handling of Malformed Messages 	
 , Jul 2014, The Require-Recipient-Valid-Since Header Field and SMTP Service Extension 
 , Sep 2014, Email Authentication Status Codes 
 , Dec 2014, A Property Types Registry for the Authentication-Results Header Field 
 , Jan 2015, IAB, IESG, and IAOC Selection, Confirmation, and Recall Process: Operation of the Nominating and Recall Committees 
 , Mar 2015, Domain-based Message Authentication, Reporting, and Conformance (DMARC) 
 , Aug 2015, Message Header Field for Indicating Message Authentication Status 
 , Oct 2018, Zstandard Compression and the application/zstd Media Type 	1 RFC
 , May 2019, Message Header Field for Indicating Message Authentication Status 
 , Jul 2019, The Authenticated Received Chain (ARC) Protocol 	
 , Feb 2020, IAB, IESG, IETF Trust, and IETF LLC Selection, Confirmation, and Recall Process: Operation of the IETF Nominating and Recall Committees 
 , Feb 2021, Zstandard Compression and the 'application/zstd' Media Type

References

Year of birth missing (living people)
Living people
Place of birth missing (living people)
Canadian computer scientists
University of Waterloo alumni
Facebook employees